This is a list of all episodes of the CBS television series Barnaby Jones.

Series overview
At present, the first season has been released on DVD by Paramount Home Video.

Episodes

Season 1 (1973)

Season 2 (1973–74)

Season 3 (1974–75)

Season 4 (1975–76)

Season 5 (1976–77)

Season 6 (1977–78)

Season 7 (1978–79)

Season 8 (1979–80)

References

See also
 List of Cannon episodes - includes Part 1 of "The Deadly Conspiracy".

External links
 

Barnaby Jones